Volodymyr Okarynskyi (born November 14, 1975, Ternopil) is a Ukrainian historian, candidate of historical (2001), docent (2004). Member of the National Union of journalists of Ukraine (2003). Awards of the president of Ukraine (2004) and the Cabinet of ministers (2008) for young scientists. Winner of the Volodymyr Hnatyuk Ternopil regional award (2018).

Biography 
Graduated from the Ternopil State Pedagogical Institute (1997). He worked as a teacher at the Ternopil Institute of social and information technologies (2002-2004), since 2004 — a teacher of the Department of history of Ukraine, archeology and special branches of historical sciences of the Ternopil Volodymyr Hnatiuk National Pedagogical University.

He held permanent columns dedicated to the history of Ternopil and the history of Ukraine in the "Ternopil newspaper" (2003-2004). Member of the editorial board of the encyclopedic publication "Ternopil region. History of cities and villages" (2014) and the International Association of humanitarians (2018).

Research interests: alternative life styles, subcultures, counterculture in Ukraine of modern and modern times; intellectual history; historical anthropology; local history (Ternopil); youth movements.

Author of about 100 scientific publications, 4 monographs, co-author of 5 collective monographs, as well as books: "Plastoviy Rukh na Ternopil region" (2007), "Ternopil / Tarnopol: history of the city" (2010, co-author), "Ternopil: City, People, history (from antiquity to 1991)" (2017).

References

Sources 
 Окаринський Володимир Михайлович // ТНПУ.
 О. Миколайчук, Володимир Окаринський — історик, який знає, коли в Тернополі… почали пити каву! // Номер один, 29.1.2018.

External links 
 Окаринський Володимир Михайлович // Науковці України.
 Володимир Окаринський // Чтиво.
 Володимир Окаринський // Історична правда.
 Юлія Томчишин, Тернопіль/Тарнополь: місто для всіх // Збруч, 12.1.2018.
 Микола Шот, Відчути Тернопіль на смак // Урядовий кур'єр, 3.7.2021.
  // TVїй Ранок.
  // Терен, 6.5.2015.
  // Телеканал ІНТБ, 19.3.2018.
  // Файний Ранок, 17.3.2019.
  // Суспільне Тернопіль, 28.8.2019.
  // Суспільне Тернопіль, 9.9.2019.
  // Телеканал Тернопіль1, 19.2.2021.
  // Локальна історія, 21.5.2021.
  // Телеканал Тернопіль1, 9.9.2021.

Living people
1975 births
20th-century Ukrainian historians
21st-century Ukrainian historians